The following is the list of squads that took place in the women's field hockey tournament at the 1992 Summer Olympics.

Group A

Australia

The following players represented Australia:

Head coach:  Brian Glencross

Canada

The following players represented Canada:

Head coach:  Marina van der Merwe

Germany

The following players represented Germany:

Head coach:  Rüdiger Hanel

Spain

The following players represented Spain:

Head coach:  José Manuel Brasa

Group B

Great Britain

The following players represented Great Britain:

Head coach:  Dennis Hay

Netherlands

The following players represented the Netherlands:

Head coach:  Roelant Oltmans

New Zealand

The following players represented New Zealand:

Head coach:  Patricia Barwick

South Korea

The following players represented South Korea:

Head coach:  Kim Chang-back

References

1992

1992 in women's field hockey